is a three volume manga picture book series created in 1957 by Osamu Tezuka for second year elementary school students. The series won the 3rd Shogakukan Manga Award in 1957.

Titles

References

External links
Biiko-chan page at TezukaOsamu.net (official site)

1957 manga
Osamu Tezuka manga
Winners of the Shogakukan Manga Award for general manga